A TPS report ("test procedure specification") is a document used by a quality assurance group or individual, particularly in software engineering, that describes the testing procedures and the testing process.

Definition
The official definition and creation is provided by the Institute of Electrical and Electronics Engineers (IEEE) as follows:

In popular culture

Office Space 
Its use in popular culture increased after the comedic 1999 film Office Space. In the movie, multiple managers and coworkers inquire about an error that protagonist Peter Gibbons (played by Ron Livingston) makes in omitting a cover sheet to send with his "TPS reports". It is used by Gibbons as an example that he has eight different bosses to whom he directly reports. According to the film's writer and director Mike Judge, the abbreviation stood for "Test Program Set" in the movie.

After Office Space, "TPS report" has come to connote pointless, mindless paperwork, and an example of "literacy practices" in the work environment that are "meaningless exercises imposed upon employees by an inept and uncaring management" and "relentlessly mundane and enervating".

References and allusions   

In King of the Hill (also produced by Mike Judge), Kahn is being chewed out, then remarks to his boss "No sir, I filed my TPS report yesterday."

The 2015 puzzle video game Please, Don't Touch Anything featured the question "What is a TPS Report?" as one of many hidden clues that lead to a unique ending.

In Lost season 1, episode 4, John Locke's boss says "Locke, I told you I need those TPS reports done by noon today."

In Ralph Breaks the Internet, a TPS report is visibly hanging in one of the cubicles seen during Ralph's viral video montage. However, it was incorrectly placed in a cubicle in the accounting department, where TPS reports are not functionally relevant.

In Borderlands 2, a legendary weapon is named the "Conference Call" with a flavor text description of "We need to talk about your DPS reports", parodying the corporate term by replacing it with the common gaming abbreviation for "Damage Per Second".

In The Mandalorian, TPS reports are mentioned in the episode "Chapter 15: The Believer" as work to do by the character Migs Mayfeld when attempting to avoid an imperial officer, in a reference to Office Space.

The TV series The Family Man features a scene in series 2, episode 1 in which the manager of the protagonist asks him to "start thinking about your TPS reports!", in amongst other apparent references to Office Space.

In the NCIS episode "Starting Over", Gary Cole's Agent Parker mentions his least favorite paperwork being TPS reports. When McGee corrects him telling him they're "TBS reports", he says, "Ah, old habits, weird", then takes a sip of coffee, paying homage to his Office Space character, Bill Lumbergh.

In Season 4, Episode 10 ("High") of Rescue Me, Janet Gavin starts a new job and hands off a TPS report at the beginning of the scene.

In the Terry Tate: Office Linebacker, Terry Tate yells, "You know you need a coversheet on your TPS reports Richard!"

In Season 2, during the first segment of the 28th Episode of Puppy Dog Pals titled "Take Your Dog To Work Day", while Bingo and Rolly are playing office, Bingo says "One sec Rolly, these TPS reports aren't gonna fix themselves."

References

External links
 
Printable PDF TPS Report

Software testing
Popular culture neologisms
Computer humor